Sir Walter Palmer, 1st Baronet (4 February 1858 – 16 April 1910) was a biscuit manufacturer and Conservative Party politician who served in the House of Commons from 1900 to 1906.

Palmer was born in Reading, Berkshire the son of George Palmer who founded the firm of Huntley & Palmer, biscuit manufacturers. He was educated at University College London, and also at the Sorbonne, Paris. He became a director of the firm and was also the first chairman of University College, Reading. In 1900 he was appointed a deputy lieutenant of Berkshire.

In 1900 Palmer was elected Member of Parliament for Salisbury. He lost his seat in the general election of 1906 by the narrow margin of 41 votes. In 1904 he was made a baronet.

Palmer married Jean Craig, daughter of William Young Craig. Their daughter, Gladys Milton Palmer, married Bertram Willes Dayrell Brooke, heir-apparent of the White Rajahs of Sarawak, titled "His Highness The Tuan Muda of Sarawak" in 1904. Gladys converted to Islam in 1932.

Palmer died on 16 April 1910 at Newbury at the age of 52; the baronetcy became extinct.

References

External links
 

1858 births
1910 deaths
Alumni of University College London
University of Paris alumni
Baronets in the Baronetage of the United Kingdom
Conservative Party (UK) MPs for English constituencies
Deputy Lieutenants of Berkshire
English Quakers
People from Reading, Berkshire
UK MPs 1900–1906
Walter